Kathleen A. Donovan (born 1952) is an American Republican Party politician, who served as County Executive of Bergen County, New Jersey. She previously served as County Clerk of Bergen County, New Jersey for four terms, and one term in the New Jersey General Assembly.  Donovan unsuccessfully sought support to run for Bergen County Executive in the 2002 Republican primary, and lost a campaign for the 2006 Republican nomination for County Executive. She ran again for County Executive in 2010, where she defeated incumbent Dennis McNerney.

Early life and education
Donovan, a graduate of Queen of Peace High School, earned a Bachelor of Arts in Political Science from Rutgers University-Newark and was awarded a Juris Doctor from the Cleveland State University College of Law. She is a resident of Rutherford, New Jersey.

Public service
Donovan was a part-time public defender of Lyndhurst, New Jersey (her hometown), from 1983 to 1988. From 1986 to 1988, she represented the 36th Legislative District in the New Jersey General Assembly. In the Assembly, Donovan served on the State Regulatory Efficiency Committee (as Vice-Chair) and as a member of the Environmental Quality Committee. She served as chairman of the  New Jersey Republican State Committee from June 1989 to February 1990, before being replaced by her predecessor, Union County Assemblyman 
Bob Franks.

She was first elected County Clerk in 1988 and was reelected in 1993, 1998, 2003 and 2008. As County Clerk, Donovan was in charge of maintaining land use records in the county, including deeds and mortgages, preserving county records, handling certain election functions including counting ballots, receiving petitions, handling absentee ballots and designing ballots, serving as the local passport office for Bergen County and handling other services including identification cards for veterans. As County Clerk she also functioned as a Recorder of Deeds for Bergen County.

In 1994 Donovan was appointed by Gov. Christine Todd Whitman as a member of the Board of Commissioners of the Port Authority of New York and New Jersey with the designation of Chairwoman of the Port Authority. As Port Authority Chairwoman, Donovan was a part-time official overseeing a bi-state agency governing all of the New York area ports, including LaGuardia Airport, Newark Liberty International Airport and John F. Kennedy International Airport, along with the World Trade Center and the PATH mass transit system between New York and New Jersey. Donovan stepped down as Port Authority Chairwoman in December 1995 in order to unsuccessfully run for Congress in the 1996 election, but she retained her seat on the agency's Board of Commissioners. Donovan remained a Port Authority Commissioner until 2002 when she was replaced by Gov. James McGreevey when her term expired. She was a commissioner when the September 11 terrorist attacks destroyed the World Trade Center. Seats on the Port Authority Board are considered one of the top political appointments that can be awarded by the Governor of New Jersey or the Governor of New York.

Bergen County Executive
Donovan ran for County Executive in 2010, where she defeated incumbent Dennis McNerney and swept into office with her three Freeholder running mates, in an election in which perceived corruption by the Democratic incumbents, and rising spending and taxes were the major issues. Donovan won with 52.9% of the vote (117,104), while McNerney received 47.1% (104,366).

On November 4, 2014, Donovan lost her reelection bid to Democratic Freeholder James J. Tedesco III, in an election in which the major issues were the county budget, consolidation of the county police and sheriff, and issues regarding lawsuits filed between the different branches of government. Election results showed her garnering 45.8% (91,299) of the vote compared to Tedesco's 54.16% (107,958).

References

External links

|-

|-

1952 births
Living people
Chairmen of the New Jersey Republican State Committee
Cleveland–Marshall College of Law alumni
County clerks in New Jersey
Bergen County, New Jersey executives
Republican Party members of the New Jersey General Assembly
People from Rutherford, New Jersey
Politicians from Bergen County, New Jersey
Rutgers University alumni
Women state legislators in New Jersey
Port Authority of New York and New Jersey people
Chairmen of the Port Authority of New York and New Jersey
21st-century American women